Cymbeline or Cymbaline may refer to:

History 
Cunobeline (died c. 40), ancient British king whose name in legend became Cymbeline

Military 
Cymbeline (radar), a mortar locating radar

Music 
"Cymbaline", a 1969 song from the Pink Floyd album, Soundtrack from the Film More
"Cymbeline", a song from the Loreena McKennitt album, The Visit
"Cimbelino", a lyric drama in 4 acts by Niccolò van Westerhout
"Cymbeline", a composition by Philip Glass to accompany the Shakespeare play
"Cymbeline", a composition by Alexander von Zemlinsky to accompany the Shakespeare play
Cymbaline, an off-stage character referenced by one of the four bridge-playing characters in Samuel Barber's short opera A Hand of Bridge

Theatre 
 Cymbeline, a play by William Shakespeare
BBC Television Shakespeare - Season Six - Cymbaline (1983) directed by Elijah Moshinsky
 Cymbeline (film), a 2014 film adaptation of the play

Gastronomy 
 "Cimbalino", a Portuguese expression for the typical espresso of Porto